LYM or Lym may refer to:

 Lanyang Museum, a museum in Taiwan
 Lebanese Youth Movement, a far-right militia in the Lebanese Civil War
 Local Yokel Media, online marketplace in Connecticut, United States 
 Lubell–Yamamoto–Meshalkin inequality, in combinatorial mathematics
 River Lym, south-west England
 Worldwide LaRouche Youth Movement, part of America's LaRouche political organization

Transport codes
 Key Lime Air, airline based in Denver, United States (ICAO code)
 Lympne Airport, airport in Kent, England (IATA code)
 Lympstone Village railway station, Devon, England (National Rail station code)

See also
 Lim (disambiguation)
 Lymm, Cheshire, England, a village